Zélindor, roi des Sylphes is an opera-ballet, a divertissement in one act, created at Versailles in 1745 by François Rebel to a libretto by François-Augustin Paradis de Moncrif. In March 1753 the ballet was revived and was the last significant success of Madame de Pompadour's troupe, the Théâtre des Petits Cabinets.

Roles
Zyrphée - soprano
Zélindor - tenor
Zulim - bass
la nymphe - soprano

Recordings
orchestra Ausonia, dir. Frédérick Haas and Mira Glodeanu ; in 20-CD box set 200 ans de Musique à Versailles Codaex (2007)	
with Le Trophée by François Francoeur. Opera Lafayette cond. Ryan Brown, Naxos (2009)

References

Operas
1745 operas